Palau competed at the 2015 Pacific Games in Port Moresby, Papua New Guinea from 4 to 18 July 2015. Palau listed 14 competitors as of 4 July 2015.

Athletics

Palau qualified five athletes in track and field:

Women
 Ruby Joy Gabriel

Men
 Gwynn Iderirk Uehara
 Rodman Teltull
 Shaquille Teltull
 Francis Tkel

Swimming

Palau qualified five athletes in swimming:

Women
 Roylin Akiwo 	
 Dirngulbai Misech
 Ikelau Misech

Men
 Noel Keane
 Shawn Wallace

Table tennis

Palau qualified three athletes in table tennis:

Women
 Zoya Renguul

Men
 Elias Aguon
 Samuel Saunders

Weightlifting

Palau qualified one athlete in weightlifting:

Men
 Stevick Patris  – 69 kg Snatch.

References

Nations at the 2015 Pacific Games
Palau at the Pacific Games
Pacific